Nake M. Kamrany Ph.D., J.D. (August 29, 1934, Kabul, Afghanistan) is a professor at the University of Southern California and Afghan-American economist.

Kamrany has over 20 publications on the political economy of Afghanistan.  He has been a Consultant to the United Nations and the U.S. Government.

References

External links
 Home page

Living people
1934 births
University of Southern California faculty
American people of Afghan descent
Afghan economists